Vijayalakshmi Singh is an Indian actress, director, costume designer and producer in Kannada. She has acted in more than 50 Kannada films and is actively involved in television projects.

Early life 
Vijayalakshmi was born in Mysore to film personalities D. Shankar Singh and Prathima Devi. Film director Rajendra Singh Babu is her elder brother.

Career 
Vijayalakshmi debuted in the early 1980s, and worked as heroine opposite top actors of Kannada films of the time like Vishnuvardhan, Anant Nag, Ravichandran, Jai Jagadish and Ramakrishna. She has worked with top directors including Puttanna Kanagal, K. Balachander, Geethapriya, K. S. L. Swamy and Nagathihalli Chandrashekhar. She was also a costume designer for her brother Rajendra Singh Babu's films like Bhaari Bharjari Bete, Bandhana and Hoovu Hannu. In the 1990s she worked as a Production Controller starting with Rani Maharani. After 2000 Vijayalakshmi has worn many hats - producer, director and supporting actress, and is associated ith several popular and successful Kannada movies. She entered television in 2020 with the Kannada serial Jothe Jotheyali.

Personal life 
Vijayalakshmi married Kannada actor Jai Jagadish. The couple have three daughters: Vaisiri, Vaibhavi and Vainidhi, who together made their acting debut through the 2019 movie Yaana, directed by Vijayalakshmi.

Selected filmography

As actress
 Shreeman (1981)
 Praya Praya Praya (1982)
 Jaggu (1983)
 Benkiyalli Aralida Hoovu (1983)
 Dharani Mandala Madhyadolage (1983)
 Shapatha (1984)
 Huli Hejje (1984)
 Dharma (1985)
 Pithamaha (1985)
 Masanada Hoovu (1985)
 Seelu nakshatra (1986)
 Hongkongnalli Agent Amar (1989)
 Nanna Preethiya Hudugi (2002)
 Veera Parampare (2010)
 Petromax (2022)

As director
 Male Barali Manju Irali
 Vaare vah
 Sweety Nanna Jodi
 Ee Bandhana
 Yaana (2019)

References

External links 
 

Kannada actresses
Actresses in Kannada cinema
21st-century Indian actresses
Kannada film directors
People from Mysore
Indian women film directors
1960 births
Living people